III is the third extended play (EP) by American indie pop band Foster the People, released on April 27, 2017, through Columbia Records. It is composed of three songs that precede the band's third full-length studio album, Sacred Hearts Club.

Background
In 2016, Foster the People performed three brand new songs at the Rocking the Daisies Music Festival, "Pay the Man", "Lotus Eater", and "Doing It for the Money", and announced that they would be on their upcoming third studio album. On April 5, 2017, the band announced a headlining summer tour in support of the album.

The band released three brand new songs, "Pay the Man", "Doing It for the Money", and "SHC", in the form of the III EP on April 27, 2017. The tracks are also featured on the band's third studio album, Sacred Hearts Club, released on July 21, 2017. The album was the first studio album to feature longtime touring musicians Sean Cimino and Isom Innis as official members.

The band collaborated with OneRepublic frontman Ryan Tedder, who served as co-writer on the song "Doing It for the Money".

The band came under fire by the Hardcore Punk and Metalcore communities after being accused of "ripping off" the cover art from Every Time I Die's acclaimed 2016 release, Low Teens with both covers utilizing a near identical format. The band has never responded or acknowledged the similarities.

Track listing

SHC's length was cut by six seconds on the full album, resulting in a time of 4:08.

Personnel
Foster the People
 Mark Foster – lead vocals, guitar, drums, percussion, piano, programming, synthesizer, vibraphone, songwriting, production
 Mark Pontius – drums, percussion, songwriting
 Sean Cimino – guitar, piano, keyboards, backing vocals
 Isom Innis – piano, keyboards, drums, percussion, backing vocals, songwriting, production

Additional personnel

 Ryan Tedder – songwriter
 Adam Schmalholz – songwriter
 Keinan Abdi Warsame – songwriter
 Justin Mohrle – songwriter
 Derek "MixedByAli" Ali – mixing engineer
 Manny Marroquin – mixing engineer
 Chris Galland – mixing engineer
 Rich Costey – mixing engineer
 Martin Cooke – mixing engineer
 Nicolas Fournier – mixing engineer
 Jeff Jackson – assistant engineer
 Robin Florent – assistant engineer
 Cyrus Taghipour – assistant engineer
 Tyler Page – assistant engineer
 Greg Calbi – mastering engineer
 Josh Abraham – producer, songwriter
 Oliver "Oligee" Goldstein – producer, songwriter
 Lars Stalfors – producer, songwriter

References

2017 EPs
Indie pop EPs
Foster the People albums